The Canadian Association for Irish Studies (CAIS) was founded by Robert O'Driscoll in 1973. Its objective is to promote the study of Irish culture in Canada, and its particular aim is to attract young scholars to the field. It uses conferences, publications and online resources to promote discussion of current ideas relating to Irish studies and culture.

CAIS has members throughout Canada. Others can be found in Ireland, the United Kingdom, the United States, elsewhere in Europe, Asia, and Australasia.

Among the Association's activities are an annual conference at a university in Canada. These conferences are attended by students, scholars, and members of the public.

The Association also publishes the semi-annual Canadian Journal of Irish Studies and a newsletter.

References

External links
 Website of the Canadian Association for Irish Studies.
 CAIS archives at the Clara Thomas Archives and Special Collections, York University Libraries, Toronto, Ontario

 
Humanities organizations
Ethnic studies
College and university associations and consortia in Canada